István Kuli (born 22 June 1998) is a Hungarian sprint canoeist.

He participated at the 2018 ICF Canoe Sprint World Championships.

References

1998 births
Hungarian male canoeists
Living people
ICF Canoe Sprint World Championships medalists in kayak
European Games competitors for Hungary
Canoeists at the 2019 European Games
21st-century Hungarian people